FGN may refer to:
 F. G. Natesa Iyer (1880–1963), Indian activist
 Family Game Night (TV series), an American game show